Yelena Nazemnova (born 11 June 1980) is a Russian freestyle and butterfly swimmer. She competed in four events at the 1996 Summer Olympics.

References

External links
 

1980 births
Living people
Russian female freestyle swimmers
Russian female butterfly swimmers
Olympic swimmers of Russia
Swimmers at the 1996 Summer Olympics
Place of birth missing (living people)